Durance-Luberon-Verdon Agglomération is the communauté d'agglomération, an intercommunal structure, centred on the town of Manosque. It is located in the Alpes-de-Haute-Provence and Var departments, in the Provence-Alpes-Côte d'Azur region, southeastern France. Created in 2013, its seat is in Manosque. Its area is 838.5 km2. Its population was 62,563 in 2019, of which 22,528 in Manosque proper.

Composition
The communauté d'agglomération consists of the following 25 communes, of which one (Vinon-sur-Verdon) in the Var department:

Allemagne-en-Provence
La Brillanne
Brunet
Le Castellet
Corbières-en-Provence
Entrevennes
Esparron-de-Verdon
Gréoux-les-Bains
Manosque
Montagnac-Montpezat
Montfuron
Oraison
Pierrevert
Puimichel
Puimoisson
Quinson
Riez
Roumoules
Sainte-Tulle
Saint-Laurent-du-Verdon
Saint-Martin-de-Brômes
Valensole
Villeneuve
Vinon-sur-Verdon
Volx

References

Durance-Luberon-Verdon
Durance-Luberon-Verdon
Durance-Luberon-Verdon